The 11th Transport Regiment "Flaminia" is a military logistics regiment of the Italian Army based in Rome. The regiment is operationally assigned to the Army General Staff and provides the necessary transport for the general staff to operate. Like all transport units of the Italian Army the regiment was named for a historic road near its base: in the 11th regiment's case for the Roman road Via Flaminia.

History 
On 1 January 1948 the Army General Staff Maneuver Auto Group was formed in Rome with personnel and materiel of the 21st Special Auto Unit and the Motorcyclists Company. On 1 May 1958 the group was renamed XI Maneuver Auto Group.

During the 1975 army reform the army disbanded the regimental level and newly independent battalions were granted for the first time their own flags. On 1 October 1975 the XI Maneuver Auto Group was renamed 11th Maneuver Auto Group "Flaminia". On 12 November 1976 the President of the Italian Republic Giovanni Leone issued decree 846, which granted the new units their flags.

On 1 July 1998 the group was renamed 11th Transport Battalion "Flaminia" and on 1 April 2014 the battalion was elevated to 11th Transport Regiment "Flaminia".

Current structure 
As of 2022 the 11th Transport Regiment "Flaminia" consists of:

  Regimental Command, in Rome
 Command and Logistic Support Company
 Transport Battalion
 1st Transport Company
 2nd Transport Company
 3rd Transport Company
 Maintenance Company

The Command and Logistic Support Company fields the following platoons: C3 Platoon, Transport and Materiel Platoon, Medical Platoon, and Commissariat Platoon.

See also 
 Military logistics

External links
Italian Army Website: 11° Reggimento Trasporti "Flaminia"

References 

Logistic Regiments of Italy
2014 establishments in Italy